Nataliya Mitrjuk (born November 26, 1959) is a Ukrainian former handball player who competed for the Soviet Union in the 1988 Summer Olympics.

In 1988, she won the bronze medal with the Soviet team. She played four matches as goalkeeper.

External links
profile

1959 births
Living people
Soviet female handball players
Ukrainian female handball players
Olympic handball players of the Soviet Union
Handball players at the 1988 Summer Olympics
Olympic bronze medalists for the Soviet Union
Olympic medalists in handball
Medalists at the 1988 Summer Olympics